Filip Syarheyevich Rudzik ((Filipp Rudik); born 22 March 1987) is a Belarusian professional footballer who plays for Smorgon

Career
In June 2014, Rudzik left FC Atyrau, going on to sign with FC Spartak Semey later in the month.

Honours
Naftan Novopolotsk
Belarusian Cup winner: 2008–09

BATE Borisov
Belarusian Premier League champion: 2011, 2012, 2013
Belarusian Super Cup winner: 2011, 2013

References

External links
 

1987 births
Living people
Belarusian footballers
Association football midfielders
Belarus international footballers
Belarusian expatriate footballers
Expatriate footballers in Kazakhstan
Expatriate footballers in Poland
Ekstraklasa players
FC Naftan Novopolotsk players
FC BATE Borisov players
FC Gomel players
FC Atyrau players
FC Spartak Semey players
Górnik Łęczna players
FC Shakhtyor Soligorsk players
FC Zhetysu players
FC Neman Grodno players
FC Gorodeya players
FC Krumkachy Minsk players
FC Smorgon players